Udugan Yamaya (Against the Tide) is a 2006 Sri Lankan Sinhala drama film directed by Sudath Devapriya and produced by National Film Corporation. It stars child actor Mauli Ferdinando with Chandani Seneviratne in lead roles along with Suminda Sirisena and Rex Kodippili. Music composed by Sarath Fernando. The film was screened at The Times London Film Festival on 24 and 28 October 2006. It is the 1072nd Sri Lankan film in the Sinhala cinema.

The film has been shot around Kathaluwa and Koggala areas. In 2004, the film was selected as the official Sri Lankan representation at the 38th Indian International Film festival in New Delhi.

Plot
Film is based on the experiences of a child caught up in the terror engulfed the country during the time of the second JVP uprising.

Cast
 Mauli Ferdinando as Sirimal
 Chandani Seneviratne as Sirimal's mother
 Richard Weerakody
 Thisuri Yuwanika as Dingiri
 Giriraj Kaushalya
 Suminda Sirisena as Sirimal's father
 Duleeka Marapana
 Saumya Liyanage
 Rex Kodippili
 Anura Wijesinghe
 Susantha Chandramali

Awards
 Sarasavi Film Festival/President Film Festival  2006 -Best Director/Best script writer/Best Film -sudath Devapriya
SIGNIS- Film Festival 2006
Best Film/Best Director -Sudath Devapriya 
 Sarasaviya Award for the best Actress in 2006 - Chandani Seneviratne
 SIGNIS Gold award for Creative Acting (Female) - Chandani Seneviratne

References

External links
 ‘ Uduganyamaya’ on Rupavahini on Sunday

2006 films
2000s Sinhala-language films
Janatha Vimukthi Peramuna
Films about rebellions
Films set in Sri Lanka (1948–present)
2006 drama films
Sri Lankan drama films
1987–1989 JVP insurrection